A. James "Jim" Croston (born  – death unknown) was an English rugby union, and professional rugby league footballer who played in the 1930s and 1940s, and coached rugby league in the 1940s and 1950s.

Playing career

International honours
Jim Croston won caps for England while at Castleford in 1936 against Wales, in 1938 against Wales (2 matches), and France, in 1939 against France, and Wales, and won a cap for Great Britain while at Castleford in 1937 against Australia.

County honours
Jim Croston won caps for Lancashire while at Castleford; he played right-, i.e. number 3, in Lancashire's 5-5 draw with Yorkshire at Leeds' stadium on 9 January 1935, played in the 7-4 victory over Cumberland at Whitehaven's stadium on 21 September 1935, scored a try in the 28-6 victory over Yorkshire at Castleford's stadium on 21 October 1936, scored 2-tries in the 18-10 victory over Cumberland at St. Helens' stadium on 31 October 1936, played in the 23-17 victory over Cumberland at Workington Town's stadium on 18 September 1937, played left-, i.e. number 4, and scored a try in the 7-5 victory over Australia in the 1937–38 Kangaroo tour of Great Britain and France match at Wilderspool Stadium, Warrington on Wednesday 29 September 1937, in front of a crowd of 16,250. played in the 8-7 victory over Cumberland at Wigan's stadium on 14 September 38, and played in the 10-10 draw with Yorkshire at Leeds' stadium on 26 October 1938.

County League appearances
Jim Croston played in Castleford's victory in the Yorkshire County League during the 1938–39 season.

Challenge Cup Final appearances
Jim Croston played right-, i.e. number 3, in Castleford's 11-8 victory over Huddersfield in the 1935 Challenge Cup Final during the 1934–35 season at Wembley Stadium, London on Saturday 4 May 1935, in front of a crowd of 39,000, and was captain in Wakefield Trinity's 13-12 victory over Wigan in the 1946 Challenge Cup Final during the 1945–46 season at Wembley Stadium, London on Saturday 4 May 1946, in front of a crowd of 54,730.

County Cup Final appearances
Jim Croston was the coach in Wakefield Trinity's 2-5 defeat by Bradford Northern in the 1945 Yorkshire County Cup Final during the 1945–46 season at Thrum Hall, Halifax on Saturday 3 November 1945, played left-, i.e. number 4, and was the coach in the 10-0 victory over Hull F.C. in the 1946 Yorkshire County Cup Final during the 1946–47 season at Headingley Rugby Stadium, Leeds on Saturday 31 November 1946, and was the coach (standing in for Harry Beverley) in the 17-3 victory over Keighley in the 1951 Yorkshire County Cup Final during the 1951–52 Northern season at Fartown Ground, Huddersfield on Saturday 27 October 1951.

Club career
Croston came from Wigan and had begun playing rugby at Castleford around 1932 after leaving the army, where he had played for United Services and won a cap for Hampshire. In November 1938, he put in a transfer request to the Castleford board and, although selected, did not turn up for the club's match with Hull. He was not named for the team that played Barrow on 26 November and said that he would retire from the sport unless his request was granted. Despite this, he was available to play for the club at the start of the 1938-39 season.

Croston made his début for Wakefield Trinity during September 1943, and he played his last match for Wakefield Trinity during the 1946–47 season, he may appear to have scored no drop-goals (or field-goals as they are currently known in Australasia), but prior to the 1974–75 season all goals, whether; conversions, penalties, or drop-goals, scored 2-points, consequently prior to this date drop-goals were often not explicitly documented, therefore '0' drop-goals may indicate drop-goals not recorded, rather than no drop-goals scored. In addition, prior to the 1949–50 season, the archaic field-goal was also still a valid means of scoring points.

References

External links
(archived by web.archive.org) Profile at thecastlefordtigers.co.uk
John Ledger: Legend Croston's starring role in real golden era of the Cup
Cas The Golden Point Pioneers
Search for "Jim Croston" at britishnewspaperarchive.co.uk

1910s births
Army rugby union players
British Army personnel of World War II 
Castleford Tigers players
England national rugby league team players
English rugby league coaches
English rugby league players
English rugby union players
Great Britain national rugby league team players
Lancashire rugby league team players
Place of death missing
Royal Engineers soldiers
Rugby league centres
Rugby league players from Wigan
Rugby union players from Wigan
Wakefield Trinity captains
Wakefield Trinity coaches
Wakefield Trinity players
Year of death missing